Seahurst is an unincorporated community in King County, Washington, United States. Seahurst is located on Puget Sound west of Burien. Seahurst has a post office with ZIP code 98062.

Climate
This region experiences warm (but not hot) and dry summers, with no average monthly temperatures above 71.6 °F.  According to the Köppen Climate Classification system, Seahurst has a warm-summer Mediterranean climate, abbreviated "Csb" on climate maps.

References

Unincorporated communities in King County, Washington
Unincorporated communities in Washington (state)